James Allnut Cason Jr. (July 25, 1927 – November 24, 2013) was a professional American football safety and halfback who played eight seasons in the All-America Football Conference (AAFC) and the National Football League (NFL), mainly for the San Francisco 49ers. He was selected for two Pro Bowls. He also started one game at quarterback in 1954 after Y. A. Tittle broke his left hand. However, Cason was relieved by Tittle in the fourth quarter of the game.

He died November 24, 2013 in Harlingen, Texas.

References

1927 births
2013 deaths
People from East Carroll Parish, Louisiana
Players of American football from Louisiana
American football safeties
LSU Tigers football players
San Francisco 49ers (AAFC) players
San Francisco 49ers players
Los Angeles Rams players
Western Conference Pro Bowl players